Boma is a Bantu language of the Democratic Republic of the Congo.

Maho (2009) considers Boma, B.821 Mpe (Kempee), and B.822 Nunu to be closely related languages. Mpe and Nunu do not have ISO codes. (Distinguish the Nunu dialect of Ngiri.)

References

See also
Eborna language

Boma-Dzing languages
Languages of the Democratic Republic of the Congo